Horizon's End! is a science fiction play by mail wargame published by Schubel & Son.

Gameplay
Horizon's End! was an open-ended wargame published by Schubel & Son. This science-fiction game was of medium complexity and had mixed moderation—a mix of hand and computers. The game was set on a colony world after widespread conflict destruction." Rather than large-scale war, the game was "a nitty-gritty, grub-in-the-dirt game, where a large proportion of your time is spent rummaging for fuel, food, and ammunition" according to reviewer John Muir. 

At the outset, each of the game's twenty players chose the focus of their group: combat or trade. This determined the funding, personnel, weapons, and vehiclesthe group would have.

Reception
In 1987, John Muir praised the game's logistics system while noting that the minor role of non-player characters was a flaw. He described the game as enjoyable with "playing potential and offer[ing] a variety of options".

See also
 List of play-by-mail games

References

References

Bibliography
 
 
 
 

Play-by-mail games